U.S. Route 11W (US 11W), locally known as Bloody 11W, is a divided highway of US 11 in the U.S. states of Tennessee and Virginia. The United States Numbered Highway, which is complemented by US 11E to the south and east, runs  from US 11, US 11E, and US 70 in Knoxville, Tennessee, north and east to US 11, US 11E, US 19, and US 421 in Bristol, Virginia. US 11W connects Knoxville and the twin cities of Bristol, Virginia, and Bristol, Tennessee, with the East Tennessee communities of Rogersville and Kingsport. The U.S. Highway has an unsigned concurrency with State Route 1 (SR 1) for its whole length in Tennessee. In 2021, the route in its entirety was labeled among the top 25 deadliest highways in the U.S.

Route description

|-
|
|
|-
|
|
|-
|Total
|
|}
US 11W begins at an intersection with the northern terminus of mainline US 11 in Tennessee, the southern end of US 11E, and US 70 in Knoxville. US 11 and US 70 head west as Magnolia Avenue toward Zoo Knoxville and Downtown Knoxville; US 11E and US 70 head east along Asheville Highway. US 11W heads northeast as Rutledge Pike, a four-lane divided highway that has a partial cloverleaf interchange with Interstate 40 (I-40) before leaving the city of Knoxville at its underpass of I-640 and US 25W. The U.S. Highway crosses to the north side of Norfolk Southern Railway's Knoxville East District and passes between the community of Mascot to the south and House Mountain to the north. US 11W crosses the Knox–Grainger county line and reduces to a two-lane road before intersecting SR 61 in Blaine. North of Blaine, the highway follows Richland Creek northeast through the Richland Valley between the Richland Knobs to the south and the Poor Valley Knobs to the north.

US 11W meets the northern end of SR 92 in the town of Rutledge, the county seat of Grainger County. The U.S. Highway passes along a narrow strip of flat land between the Valley Ridge to the north and Cherokee Lake, an impoundment of the Holston River. East of Tate Springs near the eastern end of the lake's T-shaped northern end, US 11W has an interchange with US 25E (Dixie Highway). The two highways head east on Old Lee Highway, a four-lane divided highway, toward Bean Station. SR 1 continues east on its own path as Old Lee Highway through the center of Bean Station while US 11 and US 25E head southeast on New Lee Highway. The two U.S. Highways then separate at a trumpet interchange; US 11W heads northeast as a four-lane divided highway that receives the eastern end of the unaccompanied section of SR 1 and enters Hawkins County.

US 11W meets the southern end of SR 31 (Flat Gap Road) in Mooresburg. After crossing Poor Valley Creek, the highway begins to parallel the Holston River to the south and Short Mountain on the north. At Marble Hall, US 11W veers southeast into the valley of Crockett Creek and intersects the northern end of SR 344 (Melinda Ferry Road) on its way to Rogersville, the county seat of Hawkins County. At the western end of town, the U.S. Highway meets SR 66 and SR 70 (Trail of the Lonesome Pine) at an interchange; SR 70 joins US 11W in bypassing the Rogersville Historic District. The two highways meet the northern end of SR 347 (Burton Road) before SR 70 splits north at an interchange. The U.S. Highway briefly parallels Big Creek around Bunker Hill before intersecting the west end of SR 346 (Rogersville Highway), which directly serves Surgoinsville while US 11W passes to the north of the town.

East of Surgoinsville, US 11W, whose name becomes Lee Highway, begins to parallel the Knoxville East District rail line and meets the eastern end of Surgoinville's Main Street, SR 346. The U.S. and state highways run concurrently east to Church Hill, where US 11W passes under the rail line and SR 346 splits north as that town's Main Street. The U.S. Highway enters Mount Carmel then enters the city of Kingsport, where the highway's name changes to Stone Drive, to the north of Holston Army Ammunition Plant. US 11W crosses the North Fork Holston River into Sullivan County just north of its confluence with the South Fork to form the Holston River proper. The U.S. Highway passes to the south of Hunter Wright Stadium, home of the Minor League Baseball Kingsport Mets, before meeting US 23 at a partial cloverleaf interchange; this interchange is the western terminus of I-26. US 11W continues along the northern edge of Kingsport, following Reedy Creek through partial cloverleaf interchanges with SR 36 (Lynn Garden Drive) and SR 93 (John B. Dennis Highway) before leaving the city limits.

US 11W follows Reedy Creek through the hamlet of Mill Point, where the highway intersects the northern end of SR 394, which heads southeast toward the Sullivan County seat of Blountville. Just west of Bristol, the U.S. Highway meets I-81 at a seven-ramp cloverleaf interchange. The movement from southbound US 11W to northbound I-81 is made via a ramp just south of where I-81 enters Virginia. US 11W continues east as State Street into the city of Bristol, where the highway meets the northern end of SR 126 (Blountville Highway). The U.S. Highway meets the state line at an oblique angle where the highway intersects US 421 (Gate City Highway) and SR 1, which heads east as a solo highway as State Street to its eastern terminus in the Bristol Commercial Historic District. US 11W and US 421 head northeast as Euclid Avenue through the independent city of Bristol. The highways pass DeVault Memorial Stadium, home of the Bristol Pirates, and crosses a rail line at grade before US 11W reaches its northern terminus at Commonwealth Avenue. Southbound Commonwealth Avenue carries southbound US 11E, US 19, and US 421. State Route 381 follows the north–south boulevard through the intersection; the state highway becomes I-381, a spur south from I-81, a short distance to the north.  Euclid Avenue continues east as mainline US 11 and US 19.

History
Before its establishment as US 11W, the pathway that it followed was previously used as parts of the Great Indian Warpath, Great Stagecoach Road, and Lee Highway.

US 11W from Bristol to Bean Station is designated as part of the National Highway System.

The "Tennessee Split"
In 1926, US 11W was originally established as part of US 11. This angered many local government and business representatives along US 511 (US 11E), prompting demand from then Tennessee Governor Austin Peay to have US 11 become a divided highway from Knoxville to Bristol. Tennessee officials proposed for this change to the American Association of State Highway Officials (AASHO) in 1929, and AASHO would approve the spilt in the same year, with US 11 becoming US 11W and US 511 becoming US 11E. This would later be known as the "Tennessee Split".

In 1934, following the discontinuation of split routes by AASHO, the US 11 split had ended. US 11W was recognized as US 11 again by the federal government and US 11E was reassigned to be US 411. However, AASHO had no way to enforce the elimination of the Tennessee Split. Tennessee officials never removed signage of US 11W and US 11E recognizing them as such, and state maps had still acknowledged the Tennessee Split.

In 1952, unable to have Tennessee enforce the change, AASHO designated US 11 as US 11W and US 411 as US 11E again to eliminate differences between federal and state records and maps. The split of US 11W and US 11E is still recognized .

During its design phase in the early 1960s, I-81 was intended to follow the route of US 11W from Bristol to Knoxville, but efforts led by then Senator Herbert S. Walters of Morristown had the project redirect southward through Greene, Hamblen, and Jefferson counties paralleling the route of US 11E.

Bloody 11W

Because of the highway having a history with a high rate of accidents and fatalities throughout several decades, US 11W has garnered the nickname Bloody 11W. The stretch of US 11W between Knoxville and Bristol has been labeled as one of the most dangerous stretches of highway in the state of Tennessee.

On May 13, 1972, 14 people were killed and 15 were injured in a head-on collision between a double-decker Greyhound bus and a tractor-trailer on US 11W in Bean Station, becoming one of the worst vehicular collisions in the state of Tennessee and topping headlines nationwide.

In 1973, following the deadly bus–semitruck collision in Bean Station, the Tennessee Senate and House of Representatives authorized the formation of special joint investigation committee into US 11W's ill-fated past. Joint committee members billed US 11W as one of the "killer highways" of the U.S., having been responsible for 1,068 collisions and 35 fatalities in a single year. The committee held several public forums in cities along the US 11W corridor, including Knoxville, Rutledge, Rogersville, and Kingsport.

Attendees of the forums had brought up several statements concerning US 11W, such as the highway being possibly cursed. Regarding the completion of I-81 or the widening of parallel route US 11E, some attendees suggested that it was not enough:

Plans and funding for the widening of US 11W from Bristol to Knoxville were established in 1973; however, several state and local representatives across various districts in Grainger and Hawkins counties have refused the aid of the state government After the completion of I-81, congestion and the accident count on US 11W decreased, but many still called for the widening of the highway, citing its hazardous design in Grainger and Hawkins counties.

, US 11W has since been widened to four or five lanes, except for the nearly  stretch between Blaine and Bean Station, including where the 1972 bus–truck collision had occurred. It is suggested that NIMBYism from citizens in Grainger County has played a significant role in the prevention and postponement of the highway construction.

In 2020, the Tennessee Department of Transportation (TDOT) had begun the right-of-way acquisition phase of the US 11W widening project between Rutledge and Bean Station, expecting to begin construction in 2021–2022. The section of US 11W between Blaine and Rutledge has not been planned for widening but studies by TDOT have suggested for the completion of a four-lane US 11W in order to provide safe alternative routes along the I-81/I-40 corridor region for alleviating Interstate congestion on I-40 and I-81.

In popular culture
In 1982, country music songwriter Ronnie Rogers recalled being inspired to write the Alabama hit single "Dixieland Delight" while driving on US 11W through Grainger County.

Major intersections

References

External links

Virginia Highways Project: US 11W
US 11W in VA at AARoads
US 11W in TN at AARoads

11 W
11 W
11 W
Tennessee State Route 1
U.S. Route 011W
Transportation in Sullivan County, Tennessee
Transportation in Hawkins County, Tennessee
Transportation in Grainger County, Tennessee
Transportation in Knox County, Tennessee
W
Transportation in Knoxville, Tennessee